General elections were held in the Commonwealth of the Northern Mariana Islands (CNMI) on Saturday, 5 November 2005, electing the governor and Legislature. There was also a referendum on calling a Constitutional Convention, which was approved by voters. The gubernatorial election was the
closest in the commonwealth's history, and resulted in the election of Benigno Fitial, narrowly defeating independent Heinz Hofschneider by 84 votes and incumbent Republican Governor Juan N. Babauta by an additional 98 votes.

Background
The referendum on the Constitutional Convention was called in order to comply with Chapter XVIII, article 2 of the constitution, which required a referendum to be held at least every ten years on convening such a convention. A referendum had been due in 2003 as the last referendum had been in 1993, but the Legislature had failed to organise it.

15,118 people registered with the Election Commission to vote.

Campaign
Four candidates ran for governor, each with a running mate:

Benigno Fitial of the Covenant Party, sitting Speaker of the Northern Mariana Islands House of Representatives and 2001 gubernatorial candidate.
Timothy P. Villagomez, sitting Northern Mariana Islands Representative and Vice Speaker of the House at the time of the election.
Froilan C. Tenorio of the Democratic Party, former Governor of the Northern Mariana Islands from 1994 until 1998.
Antonio Santos, educator and teacher.
Heinz Hofschneider, an independent, a sitting member of the Northern Mariana Islands House of Representatives and former Speaker until 2003. Hofschneider is a Republican, but ran as an independent in this election.
David Apatang, sitting Northern Mariana Islands Representative.
Juan N. Babauta of the Republican Party, incumbent Governor elected in 2001.
Diego T. Benavente, incumbent Lieutenant Governor of the Northern Mariana Islands elected in 2001.

Results

Governor

Legislature

Referendum

References

External links
Election results Saipan Tribune

Northern Mariana
Northern Mariana
General
Referendums in the Northern Mariana Islands
General